Andy McSmith is a freelance English journalist.

He was a journalist at The Independent newspaper from April 2007 to April 2016, having previously been political correspondent on the same paper, and political editor of the Independent on Sunday (same newspaper) and chief political correspondent of The Daily Telegraph and The Observer (part of the left-wing Guardian stable). In 1993 he was sacked by the Daily Mirror and his Labour Party friends to raise his dismissal in a motion in the House of Commons.

He is the author of seven books: biographies of longtime Conservative politician Kenneth Clarke and former Labour leader John Smith, a collection of short biographies called Faces of Labour: The Inside Story (1996), No Such Thing as Society: A History of Britain in the 1980s,  Fear and the Muse Kept Watch (2015) about the great writers and artists who lived under Stalin's rule in the Soviet Union, and a novel, Innocent in the House. He has also contributed to many other books.

He lives in London.

References

External links

British male journalists
The Independent people
Living people
Year of birth missing (living people)